(), formerly the Western Isles, is a constituency of the Scottish Parliament (Holyrood) covering the council area of Na h-Eileanan Siar. It elects one Member of the Scottish Parliament (MSP) by the first past the post method of election. It is also one of eight constituencies in the Highlands and Islands electoral region, which elects seven additional members, in addition to the eight constituency MSPs, to produce a form of proportional representation for the region as a whole.

The seat has been held by Alasdair Allan of the Scottish National Party since the 2007 Scottish Parliament election.

Electoral region 

The Na h-Eileanan an Iar constituency is part of the Highlands and Islands electoral region; the other seven constituencies are Argyll and Bute, Caithness, Sutherland and Ross, Inverness and Nairn, Moray, Orkney, Shetland and Skye, Lochaber and Badenoch.

The region covers most of Argyll and Bute council area, all of the Highland council area, most of the Moray council area, all of the Orkney Islands council area, all of the Shetland Islands council area and all of Na h-Eileanan Siar.

Constituency boundaries and council area 

The Western Isles constituency was created at the same time as the Scottish Parliament, with the name and boundaries of an existing Westminster constituency. It voted for the first time in the 1999 Scottish Parliament election. From the 2005 United Kingdom general election, however, the name of the Westminster (House of Commons) constituency was changed to Na h-Eileanan an Iar.

The Holyrood constituency covers Na h-Eileanan Siar (the Western Isles council area), comprising its nine wards: Barraigh, Bhatarsaigh, Eirisgeigh agus Uibhist a Deas; Beinn Na Foghla agus Uibhist a Tuath; Na Hearadh agus Ceann a Deas Nan Loch; Sgir’ Uige agus Ceann a Tuath Nan Loch; Sgire an Rubha; Steòrnabhagh a Deas; Steòrnabhagh a Tuath; Loch a Tuath; An Taobh Siar agus Nis.

Geographically, the constituency consists of the Outer Hebridean islands. The major islands are Barra, Benbecula, Lewis and Harris, North Uist and South Uist. On the grounds of the remoteness of the constituency from the rest of Scotland, and the difficulties involved in getting from island to island, there is a significantly smaller electorate than in the mainland Scottish Parliament constituencies.

Politics 
The seat had been a two-way marginal between the Scottish Labour and the Scottish National Party for many years. In recent years, however, it has become increasingly safe for the Scottish National Party. Despite that, during the 2014 Scottish independence referendum the constituency voted against independence by a margin of 53.42% (10,544) to 46.58% (9,195) in favour on a turnout of 86.2%

Member of the Scottish Parliament

Election results

2020s

2010s

2000s

1990s

Notes

External links

Constituencies of the Scottish Parliament
Politics of the Outer Hebrides
Scottish Parliament constituencies and regions from 2011
1999 establishments in Scotland
Constituencies established in 1999
Scottish Parliament constituencies and regions 1999–2011
Stornoway